Tingloy, officially the Municipality of Tingloy,  is a 5th class municipality in the province of Batangas, Philippines. According to the 2020 census, it has a population of 19,215 people.

The municipality comprises Maricaban Island, Caban Island, and other minor islets, all just south of the Calumpang Peninsula. Visitors to its beaches and diving facilities are a source of income.

History
The name "Tingloy" was, according to legend, derived from a plant of almost the same name, "tinghoy", which is largely found in abundance on the island up to now.

The first people to inhabit the island almost a century ago came from Taal and Bauan, presumably to escape the brutalities perpetrated by the Spanish "conquistadors". They came in family groups and finding the place a haven, settled down in definite areas later forming the various barrios now comprising the created political subdivision. It is said that the former barrio of Tingloy was founded by Jose Martinez, a Taaleño.

At several times the island was placed under the jurisdiction of different towns. The island was originally part of the town of San Luis. In 1917, it was placed under the jurisdiction of Bauan, only to be separated from it a year later when the municipality of Mabini was formed. In 1921, it was again placed under the jurisdiction of Bauan.

During the Spanish regime, people were educated at home learning to read the "Cartillas" and the "Caton" "Christiana".  During American occupation schools were established. Ireneo Martinez together with Flaviano Gamben, initiated a movement for a model schoolhouse for the former barrio of Tingloy.  This movement became a success when a model schoolhouse was constructed in the present poblacion of the Municipality of Tingloy sometime in 1921.

During the second Regular Session of the third Congress of the Republic of the Philippines, the barrios of Tingloy, Maricaban, Papaya, Pisa, Gamao, and Talahib were separated from the Municipality of Bauan and constituted into the newly created municipality of Tingloy. President Ramon Magsaysay, on June 17, 1955, appointed the first municipal Officials headed by Ramon De Claro as Mayor.

Geography
According to the Philippine Statistics Authority, the municipality has a land area of  constituting  of the  total area of Batangas.

Barangays
Tingloy is politically subdivided into 15 barangays.

Climate

Demographics

In the 2020 census, Tingloy had a population of 19,215.

Economy

Attractions

 Masasa Beach (Barangay San Juan) is one of the most visited beaches of the place, and is known for its white sand and beautiful sunset. It is located on the other side of the island which is accessible by walking or tricycle.
 Mag-Asawang Bato is one of the two peaks of the island, and this is the most visited peak by mountaineers and nature enthusiasts, where a 360° view of the whole island can be seen.
 Isla Sombrero (Sombrero Island) is a small uninhabited island located at the eastern tip of Maricaban. It is accessible through a medium-sized motor-boat or banka, and is one of the most visited beach attractions in the island.
 Batalang-Bato (Pulang Buli) is a fish sanctuary between Barangay Santo Tomas and Barangay Talahib. For research diving and snorkeling, permission is needed from the BBMC and the barangay councils of Santo Tomas and Talahib.
 Caban Island is also considered one of the tourist spots because of its white sand and scattered beaches surrounding the island.One of these are Mapating Beach, Layag Layag Point, Caban Island Beach, Fortales Beach and Bahay Kambing.
 Diving is one of the major activities in the town because of its different diving spots.

References

External links

[ Philippine Standard Geographic Code]

Municipalities of Batangas
Island municipalities in the Philippines